That Holiday Feelin' is a Christmas album by jazz singer, Joe Williams, released by Verve on November 6, 1990.

Critical reception

Scott Yanow of AllMusic writes, "One of the better Christmas jazz sets, Joe Williams is heard in quartets and quintets with pianist Norman Simmons, in several tender duets with pianist Ellis Larkins." AllMusic rated the album 3 stars out of 5.

Ron Givens of Entertainment Weekly rates this album an "A" and writes, "From the world of jazz, singer Joe Williams has delivered a warm and cozy greeting card of an album with That Holiday Feelin’. His style is casual and relaxed, so effortlessly conversational that it feels like a chat with an old friend."

Track listing

Musicians

Joe Williams – vocals
Kenny Burrell – acoustic guitar (track 10), electric guitar (tracks 2, 3, 7)
Bobby Watson – alto saxophone (tracks 2, 3, 5, 7, 9)
Seldon Powell – baritone saxophone (tracks 2, 3, 5, 7, 9)
Bob Cranshaw – bass (tracks 1, 2, 7, 10)
Paul West – bass (tracks 3, 5, 9, 11)
Dennis Mackrel – drums (tracks 1 to 3, 5, 7 to 11)
Ted Dunbar – electric guitar (tracks 3, 5, 9, 11)
Ellis Larkins – piano (tracks 4, 6, 8)
Norman Simmons – piano (tracks 1 to 3, 5, 7, 9 to 11)
Frank Wess – tenor saxophone (tracks 2, 3, 5, 7, 9)
Al Grey – trombone (tracks 2, 3, 5, 7, 9)
Clark Terry – trumpet (tracks 2, 3, 5, 7, 9)
Joe Wilder – trumpet (tracks 2, 3, 5, 7, 9)

Production

Executive producer – Richard Seidel
Producer – Bob Porter
Product Manager – Sheila Mathis
Recorded by Malcolm Addey
Recorded by (Assistant) – Ron Allaire
Arranged by Joe Williams, Norman Simmons
Horns arranged by Bobby Watson (tracks 2, 3, 5, 7, 9)

References

1990 Christmas albums
Joe Williams (jazz singer) albums